Albert Mandelbaum (1925 – unknown) was an Israeli chess player.

Biography
In the early 1950s Albert Mandelbaum was one of the leading Israeli chess players. He played mainly in domestic chess tournaments. In 1951, Albert Mandelbaum participated in Israeli Chess Championship and ranked in 4th place.
 
Albert Mandelbaum played for Israel in the Chess Olympiads:
 In 1952, at reserve board in the 10th Chess Olympiad in Helsinki (+2, =5, -1).

References

External links

Albert Mandelbaum chess games at 365Chess.com

1925 births
Year of death missing
Israeli chess players
Jewish chess players
Chess Olympiad competitors